Babil Governorate or Babylon Province ( Muḥāfaẓa Bābil) is a governorate in central Iraq. The provincial capital is the city of Hillah, which lies opposite the ancient city of Babylon (بابل), on the Euphrates river.

History
The ancient city of Babylon in present-day Babylon Province was the capital of ancient Babylonia, situated on the Euphrates river south of Baghdad, Iraq.

The city was occupied from the 3rd millennium BC but became important early in the 2nd millennium under the kings of the First Dynasty of Babylon. The sixth king of this dynasty was Hammurabi (1792–1750 BC) who made Babylon the capital of a vast empire and is best remembered for his code of laws.

The city peaked in pre-eminence when Nabopolassar (626–605 BC) and his successor and son Nebuchadnezzar II (605–562 BC) extended the Neo-Babylonian Empire over most of Western Asia.

Bestowing this name on the province is a manifestation of the policy of modern Iraq to link itself to the history of pre-Islamic Mesopotamia.

In 1991 Babil Governorate was the center of a Shia uprising.

Geography

Babylon province is located between 32° to 33.25° North latitude and 44° to 45° East longitude.

Districts
The Babil Governorate is divided into four districts:
 Al-Mahawil District (Al-Mahawil)
 Al-Musayab District (Al-Musayab)
 Hashimiya District (Al Hashimiyah)
 Hilla District (Hillah)

Cities

Postal codes

Demographics

See also
 Babylon
 Babylonia

Notes and references

External links

 
Governorates of Iraq